James Cecil Dickens (December 19, 1920 – January 2, 2015), better known by his stage name Little Jimmy Dickens, was an American country music singer and songwriter famous for his humorous novelty songs, his small size (4'11" [150 cm]), and his rhinestone-studded outfits (which he is given credit for introducing into live country music performances). He started as a member of the Grand Ole Opry in 1948 and was inducted into the Country Music Hall of Fame in 1983. Before his death he was the oldest living member of the Grand Ole Opry.

Early life
Dickens was born in Bolt, West Virginia. He began his musical career in the late 1930s, performing on radio station WJLS in Beckley, West Virginia, while attending West Virginia University. He soon quit school to pursue a full-time music career, traveling the country performing on local radio stations under the name "Jimmy the Kid".

Career

In 1948, Dickens was heard performing on WKNX, a radio station in Saginaw, Michigan, while on location at Buck Lake Ranch, Angola, Indiana. Roy Acuff introduced him to Art Satherley at Columbia Records and to officials from the Grand Ole Opry. Dickens signed with Columbia in September and joined the Opry in August. Around this time he began using the nickname Little Jimmy Dickens, inspired by his short stature.

Dickens recorded many novelty songs for Columbia, including "Country Boy", "A-Sleeping at the Foot of the Bed", and "I'm Little but I'm Loud". His song "Take an Old Cold Tater (And Wait)" inspired Hank Williams to nickname him Tater. Later, telling Dickens he needed a hit, Williams wrote "Hey Good Lookin'" in only 20 minutes while on a plane with Dickens, Minnie Pearl, and Pearl's husband, Henry Cannon. A week later, Williams recorded the song himself, jokingly telling Dickens, "That song's too good for you!", to which Dickens replied, "Much obliged, Hiram."

In 1950, Dickens formed the Country Boys with musicians Jabbo Arrington, Grady Martin, Bob Moore, and Thumbs Carllile. It was during this time that he discovered future Country Music Hall of Famer Marty Robbins at a Phoenix, Arizona, television station while on tour with the Grand Ole Opry road show. In 1957, Dickens left the Grand Ole Opry to tour with the Philip Morris Country Music Show.

In 1962, Dickens had his first top-10 country hit since 1954 with "The Violet and a Rose".

In 1964, he became the first country artist to circle the globe while on tour. He also made numerous appearances on television, including on The Tonight Show Starring Johnny Carson. In 1965, he released his biggest hit, "May the Bird of Paradise Fly Up Your Nose", which reached number 1 on the country chart and number 15 on the pop chart.

In the late 1960s, Dickens left Columbia for Decca Records before moving again to United Artists in 1971. That same year, he married his wife, Mona, and in 1975 he returned to the Grand Ole Opry. In 1983. Dickens was inducted into the Country Music Hall of Fame.

Dickens joined producers Randall Franks and Alan Autry for the In the Heat of the Night cast CD Christmas Time's A Comin’, performing "Jingle Bells" with the cast. The CD was released by Sonlite and MGM/UA and was one of the most popular Christmas releases of 1991 and 1992 with Southern retailers.

Later career

In 1984, Dickens appeared in Hank Williams Jr.'s music video for the hit single "All My Rowdy Friends Are Coming Over Tonight".

Toward the end of his life, Dickens made appearances in a number of music videos by fellow West Virginia native and country musician Brad Paisley. He was also featured on several of Paisley's albums in bonus comedy tracks, along with other Opry mainstays such as George Jones and Bill Anderson. They were collectively referred to as the Kung-Pao Buckaroos.

With the death of Hank Locklin in March 2009, Dickens became the oldest living member of the Grand Ole Opry, at the age of 90. He made regular appearances as a host at the Opry, often with the self-deprecating joke that he was also known as "Willie Nelson after taxes", playing on his resemblance to Nelson in his later years, Nelson's highly publicized problems with the Internal Revenue Service, and Dickens' own short stature. At the 2011 CMA Awards, Dickens was dressed as Justin Bieber and made fun of Bieber's then-current paternity scandal.

Personal life
Dickens married Connie Chapman in 1944; the marriage ended in divorce in 1955. Later that year, he married Ernestine Jones; she died in 1968 in an automobile accident while traveling in Texas. He married Mona Evans in 1971. They had two daughters, Pamela Detert and Lisa King.

Jimmy Dickens was a 32nd-degree Freemason, a member of Franklin Lodge #7 in Franklin, Tennessee.

Death
Dickens was hospitalized after a stroke on December 25, 2014, days after marking his birthday in what would be his last appearance on the Opry. He died of cardiac arrest on January 2, 2015, at the age of 94. After his funeral on January 8, 2015, at the Grand Ole Opry House, Dickens was entombed in the Cross Mausoleum at Woodlawn Memorial Park Cemetery in Nashville.

Discography

Studio albums

Compilation albums

Singles
{| class=wikitable style=text-align:center;
|-
! rowspan=2| Year
! rowspan=2| Song
! colspan=2| Peak positions
! rowspan=2| Album
|- style="font-size:smaller;"
! width=50| US Country
! width=50| US
|-
| rowspan=4| 1949
| align=left| "Take an Old Cold 'Tater (And Wait)"
| 7
| —
| align=left rowspan=2| Raisin' the Dickens
|-
| align=left| "Country Boy"
| 7
| —
|-
| align=left| "My Heart's Bouquet"
| 10
| —
| align=left| Big Songs by Little Jimmy Dickens
|-
| align=left| "A-Sleeping at the Foot of the Bed"
| 6
| —
| align=left| Raisin' the Dickens
|-
| rowspan=6| 1950
| align=left| "A Rose from the Bride's Bouquet"
| —
| —
| align=left rowspan=5| Non-album singles
|-
| align=left| "Hillbilly Fever"
| 3
| —
|-
| align=left| "F-o-o-l-i-s-h M-e"
| —
| —
|-
| align=left| "Walk, Chicken, Walk"
| —
| —
|-
| align=left| "Out of Business"
| —
| —
|-
| align=left| "I'm Little, but I'm Loud"
| —
| —
| align=left| Raisin' the Dickens
|-
| rowspan=5| 1951
| align=left| "Cold Feet"
| —
| —
| align=left rowspan=9| Non-album singles
|-
| align=left| "What About You"
| —
| —
|-
| align=left| "Sign On the Highway"
| —
| —
|-
| align=left| "Poor Little Darlin'"
| —
| —
|-
| align=left| "Old Rugged Cross" (with the Johnson Family Singers)
| —
| —
|-
| rowspan=7| 1952
| align=left| "They Locked God Outside the Iron Curtain"
| —
| —
|-
| align=left| "Lola Lee"
| —
| —
|-
| align=left| "Hot Diggity Dog"
| —
| —
|-
| align=left| "Waitress, Waitress"
| —
| —
|-
| align=left| "Take Up Thy Cross"
| —
| —
| align=left rowspan=2| Old Country Church
|-
| align=left| "No Tears in Heaven"
| —
| —
|-
| align=left| "Wedding Bell Waltz"
| —
| —
| align=left| Non-album single
|-
| rowspan=5| 1953
| align=left| "I Shall Not Be Moved"
| —
| —
| align=left| Old Country Church
|-
| align=left| "Sidemeat and Cabbage"
| —
| —
| align=left rowspan=4| Non-album singles
|-
| align=left| "I'm Making Love to a Stranger"
| —
| —
|-
| align=left| "Thick and Thin"
| —
| —
|-
| align=left| "No Place Like Home on Christmas"
| —
| —
|-
| rowspan=6| 1954
| align=left| "That Little Old Country Church House"
| —
| —
| align=left| Old Country Church
|-
| align=left| "Y'All Come Home"
| —
| —
| align=left rowspan=2| Non-album singles
|-
| align=left| "You Better Not Do That"
| —
| —
|-
| align=left| "Out Behind the Barn"
| 9
| —
| align=left| Raisin' the Dickens
|-
| align=left| "Blackeyed Joe's"
| —
| —
| align=left rowspan=19| Non-album singles
|-
| align=left| "Stinky Pass the Hat Around"
| —
| —
|-
| rowspan=3| 1955
| align=left| "Salty Boogie"
| —
| —
|-
| align=left| "We Could"
| —
| —
|-
| align=left| "I'm Braver Now"
| —
| —
|-
| rowspan=6| 1956
| align=left| "Hey Worm (You Wanna Wiggle)"
| —
| —
|-
| align=left| "Big Sandy"
| —
| —
|-
| align=left| "Country Boy Bounce" (with the Country Boys)
| —
| —
|-
| align=left| "Cornbread and Buttermilk"
| —
| —
|-
| align=left| "Say It Now"
| —
| —
|-
| align=left| "Raisin' the Dickens" (with the Country Boys)
| —
| —
|-
| rowspan=3| 1957
| align=left| "I Never Had the Blues"
| —
| —
|-
| align=left| "Makin' the Rounds"
| —
| —
|-
| align=left| "Family Reunion"
| —
| —
|-
| 1958
| align=left| "(I Got a) Hole in My Pocket"
| —
| —
|-
| rowspan=3| 1959
| align=left| "When Your House Is Not a Home"
| —
| —
|-
| align=left| "Hannah"
| —
| —
|-
| align=left| "Hey Ma (Hide the Daughter)"
| —
| —
|-
| rowspan=2| 1960
| align=left| "We Lived It Up"
| —
| —
|-
| align=left| "Fireball Mail"
| —
| —
| align=left| Big Songs by Little Jimmy Dickens
|-
| 1961
| align=left| "Talking to the Wall"
| —
| —
| align=left| Non-album single
|-
| rowspan=3| 1962
| align=left| "Twenty Cigarettes"
| —
| —
| align=left rowspan=2| Out Behind the Barn
|-
| align=left| "The Violet and a Rose"
| 10
| —
|-
| align=left| "Police, Police"
| —
| —
| align=left| Non-album single
|-
| 1963
| align=left| "Another Bridge to Burn"
| 28
| —
| align=left rowspan=4| Handle with Care'
|-
| rowspan=2| 1964
| align=left| "I Leaned Over Backwards for You"
| —
| —
|-
| align=left| "Is Goodbye That Easy to Say"
| —
| —
|-
| rowspan=2| 1965
| align=left| "He Stands Real Tall"
| 21
| —
|-
| align=left| "May the Bird of Paradise Fly Up Your Nose"[A]
| 1
| 15
| align=left| May the Bird of Paradise Fly Up Your Nose|-
| rowspan=3| 1966
| align=left| "When the Ship Hit the Sand"
| 27
| 103
| align=left| Greatest Hits|-
| align=left| "Who Licked the Red Off Your Candy"
| 41
| —
| align=left rowspan=4| Big Man in Country Music|-
| align=left| "Where the Buffalo Trud"
| —
| —
|-
| rowspan=3| 1967
| align=left| "Country Music Lover"
| 23
| —
|-
| align=left| "Jenny Needs a G-String (For Her Old Guitar)"
| —
| —
|- 
| align=left| "Daddy and the Wine"
| —
| —
| align=left rowspan=2| Little Jimmy Dickens Sings|-
| rowspan=4| 1968
| align=left| "I Love Lucy Brown"
| —
| —
|-
| align=left| "How to Catch an African Skeeter Alive"
| 69
| —
| align=left rowspan=2| Little Jimmy Dickens Comes Callin|-
| align=left| "Someday You'll Call My Name"
| —
| —
|-
| align=left| "When You're Seventeen"
| 55
| —
| align=left| Greatest Hits (1969)
|-
| 1969
| align=left| "Times Are Gonna Get Better"
| —
| —
| align=left rowspan=8| Non-album singles
|-
| rowspan=2| 1970
| align=left| "(You've Been Quite a Doll) Raggedy Ann"
| 75
| —
|-
| align=left| "Everyday Family Man"
| 70
| —
|-
| rowspan=2| 1971
| align=left| "Here It Comes Again"
| —
| —
|-
| align=left| "You Only Want Me for My Body"
| —
| —
|-
| rowspan=2| 1972
| align=left| "Try It, You'll Like It"
| 61
| —
|-
| align=left| "Alabam"
| —
| —
|-
| 1973
| align=left| "Dead Skunk"
| —
| —
|-
| 1976
| align=left| "Preacherman"
| —
| —
|-
| 1978
| align=left| "How Much is That Picture of Jesus?"
| —
| —
|-
| align=left colspan="5" style="font-size: 8pt"|Dash denotes releases that did not chart.
|-
|}NotesA^' "May the Bird of Paradise Fly Up Your Nose" also peaked at number 4 on the Canadian RPM Top Singles Chart.

B-sides

References

External links

 Watch Little Jimmy Dickens, "Hannah", on Ozark Jubilee'', August 1, 1959 (Flash player)
 Dickens in the Country Music Hall of Fame
 Grand Ole Opry member
 [ Allmusic]
 

1920 births
2015 deaths
American country singer-songwriters
Country Music Hall of Fame inductees
People from Raleigh County, West Virginia
Grand Ole Opry members
Columbia Records artists
Country musicians from West Virginia
West Virginia University alumni
Singer-songwriters from West Virginia